The Egitinskoye mine is a large mine located in the south-eastern Russia in Primorsky Krai. Egitinskoye represents one of the largest fluorite reserves in Russia having estimated reserves of 4.2 million tonnes of ore grading 53.2% fluorite.

References 

Fluorite mines in Russia